The American Board of Preventive Medicine (ABPM)  is a member of the American Board of Medical Specialties that issues "certificates of special knowledge" in the specialty of preventive medicine. These certificates are known as "Board Certification" in the United States and is generally recognized as verification of a physician's professional capabilities in that area. The ABPM provides board certification services for physicians trained in addiction medicine, aerospace medicine, occupational medicine, and public health and general preventive medicine and is one of two organizations to provide board certifications in these specialties with the American Osteopathic Board of Preventive Medicine serving as the other.

See also
 American Osteopathic Board of Preventive Medicine

External links 
American Board of Preventive Medicine
American College of Preventive Medicine
American Board of Medical Specialties

Medical associations based in the United States
Preventive medicine
Medical and health professional associations in Chicago